The Triathlon competition at the 2010 Central American and Caribbean Games was held in Mayagüez, Puerto Rico. 

The tournament was scheduled to be held from 24–25 July at the Balneario de Rincón at Porta del Sol.

Medal summary

Men's events

Women's events

Team events

External links

Events at the 2010 Central American and Caribbean Games
2010 in triathlon
July 2010 sports events in North America
2010
Qualification tournaments for the 2011 Pan American Games